Brown County is the name of nine counties in the United States:

 Brown County, Illinois 
 Brown County, Indiana 
 Brown County, Kansas 
 Brown County, Minnesota 
 Brown County, Nebraska 
 Brown County, Ohio 
 Brown County, South Dakota 
 Brown County, Texas 
 Brown County, Wisconsin

See also
 Broward County, Florida